Targ or TARG  may refer to:

 Targ (video game), a 1980 arcade game
 Targ (Star Trek), a fictional animal from Star Trek
 In Scientology, targs are an older word for Body Thetan
 Targe, a type of shield
 Târg, a medieval Romanian periodic fair or a market town
 TARG or telescoped ammunition revolver gun, manufactured by ARES Incorporated

See also
 House of Targ, a music venue, arcade and restaurant in Ottawa, Canada
 .20 VarTarg, a rifle cartridge